Shenny Ratna Amelia (born 28 October 1983) is an Indonesian diver. She competed in the women's 10 metre platform event at the 2000 Summer Olympics.

References

External links
 

1983 births
Living people
Indonesian female divers
Olympic divers of Indonesia
Divers at the 2000 Summer Olympics
Sportspeople from Jakarta
Divers at the 2002 Asian Games
Asian Games competitors for Indonesia
Southeast Asian Games medalists in diving
Southeast Asian Games gold medalists for Indonesia
Southeast Asian Games silver medalists for Indonesia
21st-century Indonesian women